Monterissa is a genus of minute cave snails with an operculum, gastropod mollusks in the family Hydrocenidae.

Species
Species within the genus Monterissa include:
 Monterissa gowerensis

References

 Australian Faunal Directory info
 Iredale, T. 1944. The land Mollusca of Lord Howe Island. The Australian Zoologist 10: 299-334

Hydrocenidae
Taxonomy articles created by Polbot
Monotypic gastropod genera
Taxa named by Tom Iredale